Fabien Vidalon (born 26 August 1976) is a French former footballer who is last known to have played as a defender or midfielder for Huringen IF.

Career

In 1998, Vidalon signed for French fourth division side Viry-Châtillon from Fréjus Saint-Raphaël in the French third division.

Before the second half of 2004/05, he signed for French second division club Sète, where he made 18 league appearances and scored 0 goals.

Before the 2006 season, Vidalon signed for Moss in the Norwegian second division.

In 2010, he was suspended for 3 games due to a bad tackle on Simen Rafn during a 5–1 loss to FFK.

Before the 2011 season, he signed for Norwegian fourth division team Drøbak-Frogn.

Before the 2013 season, Vidalon signed for Huringen IF in the Norwegian seventh division.

References

External links
 
 
 

Living people
1976 births
Expatriate footballers in Norway
Ligue 2 players
Championnat National 2 players
ÉFC Fréjus Saint-Raphaël players
ES Viry-Châtillon players
SO Romorantin players
Dijon FCO players
FC Sète 34 players
Moss FK players
French expatriate footballers
French expatriate sportspeople in Norway
Drøbak-Frogn IL players
Norwegian First Division players
Championnat National players
Association football defenders
French footballers